Pai Tavytera may refer to:
Pai Tavytera people
Pai Tavytera language